ExCeL London (an abbreviation for Exhibition Centre London) is an international exhibition and convention centre in the Custom House area of Newham, East London. The former hospital is situated on a  site on the northern quay of the Royal Victoria Dock in London Docklands, located between Canary Wharf and London City Airport.

History 

The centre was designed by Moxley Architects and built by Sir Robert McAlpine. It opened in November 2000. In May 2008 it was acquired by Abu Dhabi National Exhibitions Company. Phase II of development, which included building London's first International Convention Centre (ICC) and creating an "eastern arrival experience", was completed on 1 May 2010 with Phase 3 expected to be completed by 2023/24. 

In 2015, CentrEd at ExCeL was opened, which expanded the centre's facilities to incorporate training and meeting space near the western entrance of the venue overlooking Royal Victoria Dock.

The Royal Victoria Dock closed to commercial traffic in 1981, but it is still accessible to shipping. The Centre's waterfront location allows visiting vessels to moor alongside the Centre. An example of this is HMS Sutherland visiting the 2005 London Boat Show. 

The design of the exhibition building consists of two column-free, rectangular, sub-divisible halls of approximately 479,493 sq. ft. (44,546 sq. m.), on either side of a central boulevard containing catering facilities and information points. There are also three sets of function rooms, one overlooking the water, another above the western end of the central boulevard, and the third on the north side of the building which are used for smaller meetings, seminars, presentations and corporate hospitality. The property is surrounded by six hotels, bars and restaurants, and 1,800 parking spaces situated underneath the property with 85 accessible spaces.

ExCeL London has hosted numerous consumer and trade, private and public events, including exhibitions, conferences, concerts, weddings and religious events. Among these have been WorldSkills London 2011, the London Boat Show, the British International Motor Show, Grand Designs Live, the Carole Nash MCN Motorcycle Show, MCM London Comic Con, the London International Music Show, Star Wars Celebration Europe, London Marathon registration, the World Travel Market, The Clothes Show London, Defence Security and Equipment International (DSEi), The Dive Show, the Global Peace and Unity Event, the 2009 G-20 London Summit, IP Expo Europe and Summer in the City.

In 2011 ExCeL London was awarded the Business Superbrand, and welcomed its 20 millionth visitor on 18 June 2014. ExCeL has also been awarded 'Venue of the Year' on several occasions at various industry ceremonies. In 2012, ExCeL hosted several events for the Olympics and Paralympics, and has since erected a "legacy wall" featuring the handprints of athletes who won Gold at the venue and the former Mayor of London Boris Johnson.

In 2014 ExCeL hosted the Global Summit to End Sexual Violence in Conflict, chaired by American actress and UN Special Envoy Angelina Jolie and attended by 79 ministers from 123 country delegations.

From 1 to 8 July 2019, 150 events took place as part of London Climate Action Week 2019.

It was announced on 24 March 2020 that the centre was to be temporarily converted into the 4,000-bed NHS Nightingale Hospital as part of the response to the 2020 coronavirus (COVID-19) pandemic. Military engineers and contractors supported the erection of the facility, and army medics assisted the NHS nurses, doctors and other staff. The Nightingale was opened on 3 April 2020 by Charles, Prince of Wales via videolink.

Transport 
ExCeL London is served by two Docklands Light Railway (DLR) stations, which span the full 600-metre length of the venue. The western entrance is directly linked to Custom House for ExCeL station, which serves the Platinum Suite and the event halls and is located next to the glass pyramid. Since 24 May 2022, the western entrance of ExCeL has been served by the Elizabeth line (known as the Crossrail project during construction), connecting the venue to central London in 12 minutes.

The eastern entrance is connected to Prince Regent station. The eastern entrance serves the International Convention Centre (ICC at ExCeL), which was opened in 2010 by then-Mayor Boris Johnson and is London's first and currently only ICC. During major shows with large visitor attendances, extra shuttle trains are run between the venue and Canning Town station, which connects with London Underground's Jubilee line. Since June 2012, the Emirates Air Line cable car now links ExCeL to The O2 on the Greenwich Peninsula.

ExCeL London is also located near London City Airport station, which is linked by the DLR and a number of dual-carriageway roads which also provide onward access to the office and commercial district of Canary Wharf.

Sustainability and CSR 
ExCeL London participates in the UN Global Compact Scheme, the world's largest corporate sustainability initiative which invites companies to align with universal principles on human rights, labour, environment and anti-corruption. As part of this scheme, ExCeL hosts annual events to communication on progress addressing the issues of Human Rights, Labour, Environment and Anti-Corruption. Since joining the scheme in August 2007, ExCeL has undertaken a series of initiatives to reduce energy usage, increase recycling efforts and increase transparency across the business, such as the introduction of a whistleblowing hotline in May 2015.

ExCeL publishes details of its corporate social responsibility (CSR) efforts publicly in the UN Global Compact report and on their website. Currently ExCeL invests in the local community of Newham by supporting select charities, chiefly Newham All Star Sports Academy (NASSA) and Community Food Enterprise (CFE). ExCeL also provides space free of charge to local schools and sports teams, in addition to hosting an annual event called 'ExCeL in the Arts' for local children to attend. In 2016, ExCeL welcomed London celebrity chef, musician and entrepreneur Levi Roots, who in collaboration with a local food initiative organised a cooking class for local children

Sport

Olympics 

For the 2012 Summer Olympics, ExCeL London was divided into five sports halls with capacities ranging from 5,000 to 7,000 that were used for boxing, fencing, judo, taekwondo, table tennis, weightlifting, and wrestling.

Boxing 
ExCeL hosted two boxing matches on 10 December 2005, the first between British heavyweights Danny Williams and Audley Harrison and the second between Amir Khan and Daniel Thorpe.

ExCeL also hosted the boxing match on 22 April 2008 between Amir Khan and Gairy St. Clair for the World Boxing Organization intercontinental lightweight title, and the boxing match on 29 November 2014 between Derek Chisora and Tyson Fury in a World Boxing Organization heavyweight championship eliminator.

Triathlon 
The Virgin Active London Triathlon is held at ExCeL London on an annual basis, with the cycling and running legs taking place within and around the venue and the swim taking place in Royal Victoria Dock, adjacent to ExCeL.

Motorsport 

The Formula E London ePrix was held for back to back races at ExCel in July 2021 with part of the circuit running around the arena and part of the circuit in the exhibition hall itself. It was also due to be held in 2020, however the event was cancelled after the ExCeL was repurposed as a temporary NHS hospital named NHS Nightingale, to deal with the Coronavirus pandemic.It is due to hold the final 2 rounds of the 2022-23 Formula E World Championship, after holding the penultimate round in 2022.

COVID-19 pandemic 

On 24 March 2020, the ExCeL was announced as a temporary NHS hospital, containing 5000 beds and named NHS Nightingale, to deal with the Coronavirus pandemic. This alternate care site was planned to shut down in early May 2020, but was also used as a mass vaccination centre as part of the COVID-19 vaccination programme from 11 January 2021.

Other events 

ExCeL London has hosted the following events:
 In 2003 filmmaker Dominic Leung filmed the music video of Coldplay's single Clocks here with a laser show in front of a staged audience including university students.
 The 2009 G20 London summit on Stability, Growth & Jobs
 Each May and October, The MCM London Comic Con multi-genre convention is held at ExCeL.
 Since 2001, the biannual UK arms fair DSEi.
 In 2005, the Bollywood cultural event, the 2005 Zee Cine Awards for the first time in the event's history.
 British International Motor Show 2006 & 2008 attracting over 400,000 visitors to the venue and included a Music Festival with live performances in a 5,000 capacity purpose-built arena each night of the motor show.
 Between 27–29 April 2007, the 2007 London Guitar Show (LGS). The show featured two masterclasses on the Saturday with Steve Vai, in which time he answered questions asked by fans through the LGS website prior to the show, and from fans at the masterclass.
 Between 13–15 July 2007, the Star Wars Celebration Europe; the first Star Wars fan event of its kind held outside the United States which attracted nearly 40,000 visitors over the three days.
 In October 2007, the 2007 Nickelodeon Kids' Choice Awards, the first time it was held in the UK
 In 2007, was the Permanence – the operational and media headquarters – for the Grand Départ of the Tour de France.
 On 26 April 2008, the Bollywood cultural event, the 2008 Zee Cine Awards for the second time.
 On 27 May 2008, the Ahmadiyya Khilafat (Caliphate) Centenary was held.
 On 31 October 2008, Stuff Live, a yearly show sponsored by the magazine, What Hi-Fi? Sound and Vision.
 On 2 April 2009, annual G-20 Leaders' Summit on Financial Markets and the World Economy, commonly called The London Summit 2009, the largest gathering of world leaders London has seen since the first United Nations General Assembly in 1946.
 Between 1–2 May 2010, The X Factor held open auditions which attracted over 10,000 people.
 The ICC Auditorium also hosted Miss World 2014 on 14 December 2014.
 Between 29–31 May 2009, Clothes Show London returned to the capital.
 In 2009 and 2010, it played host to the London audition stages of the ITV singer search programme The X Factor.
 On Sunday 16 December 2012 it played host to the 2012 BBC Sports Personality of the Year.
 In late 2012 Olly Murs filmed the video to Army of Two here.
 From 22–24 November, the ExCeL played host to the Doctor Who Celebration convention, in celebration of the 50th anniversary of the BBC television series, Doctor Who.
 In April 2014, 49th annual meeting of the European Association for the Study of the Liver.
 The building's halls are used by University College London and King's College London for many of their exams.
 Between 14–18 August 2014, Loncon 3, the 72nd World Science Fiction Convention.
 BRICK 2014, a Lego event for Lego fans, took place between 27 and 30 November 2014. The event also happened in December 2015.
 It hosted Miss World 2014 finals on 14 December
 ExCeL hosted IP Expo Europe on 5–6 October 2016, Europe's largest IT event
 It hosts Redeemed Christian Church of God Festival of Life twice a year. It was last held on 21 October 2016.
 It hosted the 2016 BBC Music Awards on 12 December, broadcast live on BBC One.
 ExCeL hosted the inaugural RTX London between 14–15 October 2017, as well as the upcoming RTX London between 15–16 September 2018.
 ExCeL hosted the final weekend of the 14th series of The X Factor on 2–3 December 2017.
 ExCel also hosted Miss World 2019 finals on 14 December.
 The 2022 Pokémon World Championships was held at ExCeL on 18-21 August 2022, becoming the first edition of the World Championships to be held outside of North America, as well as the first edition to be a four-day event.
 Star Wars Celebration Europe is planned to be held at ExCeL on April 7–10 in 2023.
ExCeL hosted the RuPaul's DragCon UK event, from January 6-8, 2023.

Protest 
Demonstrators camped outside ExCel to protest against the DSEI fair in 2019, in an attempt to block access, which resulted in the police arresting 100 people for allegedly obstructing the highway.

References

External links 

 
 ExCeL London What's On guide

Exhibition and conference centres in London
Buildings and structures in the London Borough of Newham
Sport in the London Borough of Newham
Excel London
Venues of the 2012 Summer Olympics
Tourist attractions in the London Borough of Newham
Olympic boxing venues
Olympic fencing venues
Olympic judo venues
Olympic table tennis venues
Olympic taekwondo venues
Olympic weightlifting venues
Olympic wrestling venues
2012 Summer Paralympic venues
Boxing venues in the United Kingdom
Privately owned public spaces
Canning Town
Trade fair venues
NHS hospitals in London